The Chicago and North Western Railway class Z (and Omaha Road class Z) was a class of 251 American 2-8-0 locomotives. They were built between 1909 and 1913, when production switched to the larger class J 2-8-2 locomotives. The class letter spawned their nickname amongst C&NW and Omaha Road crews: "Zulu".

Design
The locomotives has boiler pressed to  feeding steam to two cylinders that had a  bore and a  stroke. These were connected to  driving wheels buy Walschaerts valve gear, although the last 47 were built with Baker valve gear. They had  piston valves with  travel. The resulting  was 14 per cent larger than the class R-1.

Construction
Apart from a batch of 25 built by the Baldwin Locomotive Works, all the locomotives were built by the American Locomotive Company at their Schenectady plant. Baldwin classified their locomotives as 10-48-E

Service
On the C&NW, they were used system-wide on freight trains, and were the principle freight-hauling locomotive on the railway until the arrival of the class J Mikados. The extra power over the existing freight locomotives enabled running 75-car trains; unfortunately, older wooden-framed freight cars could not stand the punishment and a large number of "bad-ordered" cars required repairs. The Omaha Road used its pair, like all its 2-8-0s, in switching, transfer and helper service. They had in fact been delivered a week after the Omaha Road's first class J 2-8-2 locomotives.

When new all had been built as hand-fired coal-burning locomotives. The large grates were tricky to fire and several firemen resigned as a result. At least 17 were fitted-up for oil-firing for use in Wyoming, where fuel oil was readily available. Twelve others received mechanical stokers during World War II.

In 1942, several locomotives were leased out to other operators; by war's end, these had either been purchased or returned. Sales included five to American Smelting and Refining Company (ASRCo), five to the Seaboard Air Line Railroad (SAL), two to the St. Louis Southwestern Railway (Cotton Belt or SSW), 25 to the Ferrocarriles Nacionales de México (NdeM) directly, and another seven via a dealer. They also later acquired ASRCo's five.

The first retirement was in 1936; fifty were still in service in mid-1948. The Omaha Road retired both of its Zulus in June 1956.

No locomotives of this class have been preserved.

References

Z
2-8-0 locomotives
ALCO locomotives
Baldwin locomotives
Railway locomotives introduced in 1909
Steam locomotives of the United States
Standard gauge locomotives of the United States
Scrapped locomotives
Freight locomotives